The Association of Guineans in France was one of two opposition groups from Guinea in exile in France during the regime of Sékou Touré. Like its counterpart, the Front for the National Liberation of Guinea, the association was composed of mainly exiled cabinet ministers and university graduates, discontent with Touré's regime.

References

African diaspora in France
Guinean diaspora
Politics of Guinea
History of Guinea
France–Guinea relations
Diaspora organizations in France